Elections for a Legislative Assembly were held in Nauru on 26 January 1968.

Background
A Constitutional Convention had been elected in 1967. It produced a new constitution in preparation for independence, which provided for an 18-member Legislative Assembly with a three-year term. The Assembly would then appoint a five-member Council of State to exercise executive power.

Results
Of the 18 elected members, half consisted of the nine members of the Legislative Council elected in 1966.

Aftermath
The Assembly met for the first time on 31 January and elected the new five-member Council of State. Seven candidates were nominated for the contest, although Victor Eoaeo pulled out as he continued to oppose Nauruan independence. The Council subsequently elected Hammer DeRoburt as its chairman.

On 17 May the Assembly elected the first President. Bernicke, DeRoburt and Detudamo were all nominated. However, Bernicke and Detudamo both declined their nominations, resulting in DeRoburt being elected unopposed. He then formed a new cabinet, with Bernicke as Minister for Health and Education, Bop as Minister for Finance, Detsimea as Minister for Justice and Detudamo as Minister for Works.

References

1968 elections in Oceania
1968 in Nauru
1968